Peta Hewitt (born 1966) is the Australian artist best known for her YouTube channel (in 2015) and her long running science-fantasy comic series Terinu (both in print and online) for which she is both writer and artist.

YouTube
Hewitt started creating YouTube content in 2015, where she reviews 'Adult Colouring Books' providing her viewers with a detailed look at colouring books, its pages as well providing hints and tips and show casing her completed pictures. Hewitt has branched out into art supply reviews and tutorials about colouring.

Comics
Hewitt's First comic was Snowy Sam, this was a children's comic featuring the adventure of Snowy Sam and his sled team as they dealt with several environmental issues faced in the north pole. The Snowy Sam comics were featured in several dog magazines across the United States and Europe.

Terinu is Hewitt's most well known comic this was provide online as well as in printed format (in 1996). The Web version was taken down in 2012, but returned in 2014 and is still available for reading. Hewitt is no longer writing Terinu, but has stated that she would like to complete the current and final story arc.

Personal life
Hewitt was born in Geelong, Victoria in 1966 to James and Marjory Little. She has two brothers and four sisters. Hewitt attended Norlane High School and graduated in 1984. She married Wayne Hewitt in September 1992 and they have 3 children.

Hewitt Attained a Bachelors of Nursing in 1989 From the Geelong Hospital School of Nursing. She is currently employed as a nurse for Barwon Health.

External links
 Official Colouring website
 Official YouTube channel
 Official Terinu website
 National Library Archive of Snowy Sam Comic
 Peta Hewitt's Deviant Art site

1966 births
Living people
Australian artists
Australian YouTubers
People from Geelong